The Raibl Formation is an Upper Triassic geologic formation in the Northern and Southern Limestone mountain ranges of the Eastern Alps, in Central Europe.

Description 
It preserves fossils dating back to the Norian Middle Triassic sub-period of the Triassic period, during the Mesozoic Era.

See also 
 
 List of fossiliferous stratigraphic units in Austria
 List of fossiliferous stratigraphic units in Italy
 List of fossiliferous stratigraphic units in Slovenia

References 

Geologic formations of Austria
Geologic formations of Italy
Geologic formations of Slovenia
Triassic System of Europe
Triassic Austria
Triassic Italy
Norian Stage
Geology of the Alps
Northern Limestone Alps
Southern Limestone Alps